Hello Darling is a 1975 Indian Malayalam film,  directed by A. B. Raj and produced by R. S. Sreenivasan. The film stars Prem Nazir, Jayabharathi, Sudheer, Bahadoor, Adoor Bhasi and Sankaradi in the lead roles. The film has musical score by M. K. Arjunan.

Cast

Prem Nazir as Venu
Jayabharathi as Syamala
Sudheer as Rajesh
Bahadoor as Appukuttan
Adoor Bhasi as Padmarajan
Sankaradi as Pachu Pilla
Mallika Sukumaran as Leela
Meena as Kochunarayani
Rani Chandra as sumithra
Sreelatha Namboothiri as Latha
Jagathy Sreekumar as Vijayan
Alummoodan as Harshan Pilla
Manavalan Joseph as Mahadevan
Jose Prakash as Krishna Kumar
Paravoor Bharathan as Sekhar
Khadeeja as Kamalabhai
Prathapachandran as Police officer

Soundtrack
The music was composed by M. K. Arjunan and the lyrics were written by Vayalar.

References

External links
 

1975 films
1970s Malayalam-language films